WWE Slam City is an American animated show that was produced by WWE, which aired on the WWE Network and Wednesday evenings on Nicktoons. WWE Slam City was based on the Mattel action figure series starring toyetic versions of the then-current WWE roster.

Description
“The series, filmed in the next generation of stop-motion animation, features a new WWE animated character The Finisher, who fires all of the WWE wrestlers and sends them to Slam City to find day jobs. The wrestlers are plunged into new career challenges as they pack every street corner with work to do and scores to settle. It features John Cena as an auto mechanic, Rey Mysterio as a traffic guard, Alberto Del Rio as a coffee house barista, Mark Henry as a pizza shop mascot, CM Punk as an ice-cream man, Randy Orton as a zookeeper, Kane as a chef and Sheamus as a theater usher. Daniel Bryan, The Miz, Big Show, Brock Lesnar, Santino Marella and Damien Sandow are still jobless but Santino and Sandow are the most desperate to find one. WWE Legends Stone Cold Steve Austin and The Rock are also featured in Slam City. The 'Stretch Move' feature of Slam City characters is highlighted in WWE Slam City.”

Characters
John Cena
Rey Mysterio
Alberto Del Rio
Mark Henry
CM Punk
Randy Orton
Kane
Sheamus
Daniel Bryan
The Miz
Big Show
Brock Lesnar
Santino Marella
Damien Sandow
Stone Cold Steve Austin
The Rock
AJ Lee

Comics
WWE Slam City Comics are a series of graphic novels based on WWE Slam City webisodes which were released on August 26, 2014, by WWE and published by Papercutz with the creators being Mathias Triton and Alitha E. Martinez.

See also
Camp WWE
Hulk Hogan's Rock 'n' Wrestling

References

External links
 Official Website

Slam City
Slam City
American children's animated comedy television series
American children's animated sports television series
English-language television shows
2014 web series debuts
2014 web series endings
American animated web series
Animation based on real people